Olga Yurievna Seryabkina (born 12 April 1985) is a Russian singer-songwriter. She is a former member of  girl group Serebro, which won third place in the Eurovision Song Contest 2007, until 2019 when she confirmed that she would leave the group – the last of the original lineup to do so.

Life and career

Early life and career (1985–2007)
At seven years old, Olga Seryabkina began studying ballet.

Serebro (2007–2019)
After that she joined Serebro. She was brought to the casting by her friend Elena Temnikova, who was already a band member. They took part in the Eurovision Song Contest 2007 and won 3rd place.

Today Serebro is one of the most popular Russian bands. In 2007 she started writing lyrics for the group. In October 2007, there were some rumors that Olga was leaving the band because it was said she had problems with the lead singer Elena Temnikova, but that wasn't true. Max Fadeev, the manager of the band, also said that the replacement for Olga had already been found, but Olga decided not to leave Serebro.

On 9 October 2018 Seryabkina (the only remaining member of the original line-up) announced via Instagram that she is leaving the group in 2019 to concentrate on her solo career.

Solo career (2014–present)

Her solo career began with the name Holy Molly at first, later being changed solely to Molly.  In 2022, she released an album under her own name.

Other activities
On 8 August 2008 Olga participated in “The stars motor racing” in Yarkhoma Park. The other competitors were Iljya Zudin (from the band Dinamit), Marina Lizorkina (also a Serebro member), Star Factory-participants Lena Kukarskaya and Oleg Dobrynin, Maxim Postelnyj (from the band Plazma) and Sid Spirin (from the band Tarakany!) among others. A true excitement was displayed by the band Serebro only. They showed a real fighting capacity, for instance, Marina Lizorkina even had her motorcycle gloves with her. Lena Temnikova also came to the racing and actively supported her colleagues, but she didn't take part in the competition. Only three participants took part in the final motor-racing. It was a time trial without any obstacles, and Olga Seryabkina was the winner.

Personal life

She graduated from an art school in Moscow and from the ИМПЭ Institute, earning a higher education diploma in Specialization in Translation and Entrepreneurship. Olga Seryabkina is fluent in Russian, English and German.

In June 2019, Seryabkina came out as bisexual in an interview with the Russian tabloid Super. She did so to dispel rumors she was in a relationship with Maxim Fadeev, which were spread by her former bandmate Elena Temnikova. In the interview, Seryabkina confirmed she had been in a four-year relationship with Temnikova while they were bandmates, and that the relationship was well known throughout their inner circle, but they had never confirmed it publicly. Since ending her relationship with Temnikova, Seryabkina has solely dated men.

In 2020, Seryabkina secretly married 32-year-old Georgy Nachkebia in a suburb of Vienna. According to the singer, Nachkebia "is involved in projects in various fields - from show business to high technology." She and Nachkebia have known each other for many years, and "really became close only after I left Maxim Fadeev's label." On September 13, 2021, she confirmed her first pregnancy to Tatler Russia.

On November 20, 2021, Seryabkina gave birth to her and Nachkebia's child together, a son named Luca.

Discography

Albums (as Molly)
Косатка в небе (2019)

Albums (as Olga Seryabkina)
Синий цвет твоей любви (2022)

EPs (as Olga Seryabkina)
Причины (2020)

Singles

Russian singles

As Olga Seryabkina

As Molly

English singles
As Molly

As Olga Seryabkina

Promotional singles

Other charted songs

Features

Awards

References

External links

Official website of Serebro

Instagram of Serebro / Molly

1985 births
Living people
Singers from Moscow
Russian singer-songwriters
Russian women singer-songwriters
Serebro members
21st-century Russian women singers
21st-century Russian singers
Russian LGBT musicians
Bisexual musicians
Bisexual women